Southwest Community Park is a public park in Chatham County, North Carolina in the United States, operated by the Chatham County Parks and Recreation Department.

Amenities include a softball field, multi-Purpose Field, picnic pavilion, walking trail, playground, sand volleyball court, restrooms, concession stand with kitchen, and parking.

Events include Movies in the Park and Family Fun Days.

References

External links
 on Google Maps
Chatham County: Parks & Recreation

Parks in North Carolina
Protected areas of Chatham County, North Carolina